Proxys is a genus of stink bugs in the family Pentatomidae.

Species
 Proxys albopunctulatus (Palisot, 1811)
 Proxys obtusicornis Stål, 1872
 Proxys punctulatus (Palisot, 1818) – black stink bug
 Proxys victor (Fabricius, 1775)

References

Further reading

External links

 

Carpocorini
Articles created by Qbugbot